The Kuznetsov TV-2 was a turboprop engine, designed by the Kuybyshev Engine Design Bureau.

Applications
TV-2F Antonov An-8 (proposed)Tupolev '101' (project)Tupolev '102' (project)Tupolev Tu-118 (project)

TV-2M Tupolev Tu-91 (prototype only)

TV-2T Antonov An-8 (proposed)

Specifications (TV-2F)

See also

References

1950s turboprop engines
Kuznetsov aircraft engines